Death Ship is a 1980 horror film directed by Alvin Rakoff and starring Richard Crenna, George Kennedy, Nick Mancuso, Sally Ann Howes, Kate Reid, Victoria Burgoyne, and Saul Rubinek in an early role. The screenplay by John Robins was based on a story by Jack Hill and David P. Lewis.

A British-Canadian co-production, the film was shot on-location in Dauphin Island, Alabama; Quebec City, Quebec; and the Gulf of Mexico. It was director Rakoff's only horror film, and upon release received mixed-to-negative reviews, but is considered a cult classic.

Plot
Short Plot;
Survivors of a tragic shipping collision are rescued by a mysterious black ship which appears out of the fog; little do they realise that the ship is a Nazi torture ship which has sailed the seas for years, luring unsuspecting sailors.

Prickly Captain Ashland is leading his cruise ship on his final voyage, attended by his replacement Trevor Marshall, who has brought along his family. In the middle of the night following a routine Caribbean route, their radar detects a mysterious black freighter on a collision course that matches their heading regardless of evasive maneuvers. Despite Ashland's best efforts, the boats collide, sinking the cruise ship and taking with it most of her crew and passengers.

The next day, a handful of survivors — Marshall, his wife Margaret, their children Robin and Ben, a young officer named Nick and his love interest Lori, the ship's comic Jackie, and a passenger, Mrs. Morgan — are adrift on a large piece of wreckage. Ashland surfaces nearby and he's brought aboard, barely conscious. Later, the survivors come upon the black freighter, unaware it's the ship that attacked them. Finding a boarding ladder slung from the stern, they climb aboard, but not before the ladder plunges into the sea as the officers try to climb it with the injured Ashland. When all are finally aboard, Jackie tries to rally the survivors with humor, but a cable seizes him by the ankle, and he is swung outboard by one of the ship's cranes, which lowers him into the water before cutting him loose, to be swept astern and lost.

Shocked, the survivors explore the corridors of the empty, echoing vessel, finding only cobwebs and 1930s memorabilia. Hatches open and close by themselves and lights go on and off while a swinging block knocks out Nick, who is exploring above deck. Meanwhile, a delirious Ashland hears a mysterious, disembodied voice speaking to him in German. The others finally set up in a dusty bunk room, and they separate to retrieve supplies and the injured captain. Mrs. Morgan finds a gramophone and a movie projector that suddenly turn on by themselves. While watching the film (1936's Everything Is Rhythm) and eating a piece of hard candy from one of the ship's cupboards, she begins decomposing and becomes grotesquely deformed. Terrified, she stumbles back to the bunk room, where a possessed Ashland strangles her.

Now awake, and apparently possessed by the ship's dead captain, Ashland dons a Kriegsmarine officer's uniform and announces that he is the captain. Marshall and Nick make a chilling discovery: the ship was once a Nazi prison ship, and the ghosts of its inmates and crew are still aboard. Upon visiting the chart room, they see that the map of the ship's course shows that it just travels round and round the Atlantic in huge circles. They both decide to escape, but are thwarted when the ship's lifeboats lower into the sea by themselves and drift away. Despairing, the survivors try to get some rest but are further taunted by Ashland, who now prowls the ship's passages. While the children stumble upon a radio room which starts playing "Horst-Wessel-Lied", Lori goes into shock when her shower water turns to blood. She's then tossed overboard by Ashland.

Marshall and Nick are attacked by the piercing whine of the ship's electronics as the projector now begins showing old newsreel footage of Adolf Hitler. Nick lunges at Ashland, but instead plunges into a net holding skeletal remains, where Ashland drowns him. Ashland tells Marshall that the ship is possessed by the spirits of its long-dead crew, and hunts other boats in its path, destroying them and luring the survivors on-board to kill them and feed on their blood. Marshall manages to stab a gloating Ashland, apparently killing him and stopping the ship. Searching below, Marshall finds a life raft in a freezer full of the frozen bodies of downed RAF airmen and Soviet sailors, but as the children are jumping overboard, Margaret is captured by a resurrected Ashland and is trapped in a chain locker. Marshall is knocked out by Ashland, but awakens in time to find Margaret, who has escaped from the locker. Captain Ashland attempts to shoot the escaping Marshall family.

Meanwhile, the spirits of the crew detect another cruise liner and begin to give chase, ignoring Ashland, who wants it to run down the Marshalls' raft instead. Trying to re-take control of the ship, Ashland storms into the engine room and shoots at the machinery in vain, but falls into the steering gear and is crushed to death. His screams of agony echo throughout the ship, joining those of its earlier victims. Above, the Marshalls rejoice as the freighter turns and sails away. After drifting for some time, they are spotted by a search helicopter and rescued.

The Death Ship is shown afterward steaming along at full speed, the ghosts of the crew once again announcing "Enemy in sight!" in German. It heads for another passenger ship, and the sounds of the collision are accompanied by the triumphant blasting of its horn.

Cast
 Richard Crenna as Trevor Marshall
 George Kennedy as Captain Ashland
 Nick Mancuso as Nick
 Sally Ann Howes as Margaret Marshall
 Kate Reid as Sylvia Morgan
 Victoria Burgoyne as Lori
 Jennifer McKinney as Robin Marshall
 Danny Higham as Ben Marshall
 Saul Rubinek as Jackie
 Murray Cruchley as Parsons
 Anthony Sherwood as Seaman

Production
Death Ship was shot in Québec; Dauphin Island, Mobile, Alabama; and in the Gulf of Mexico.

Release
Death Ship was released in 250 theatres in Wisconsin, Texas and Florida on March 7, 1980 where it was distributed by Avco Embassy Pictures. It was released in Edmonton, Canada where it was distributed by Astral Films.

Reception

From a contemporary review, Steven Jenkins reviewed the film in the Monthly Film Bulletin, stating that the film had a "promising central idea - an ex-Nazi torture ship prowling the ocean in search of blood - is interred in a particularly pedestrian narrative." The review also critiqued the "arbitrary borrowing from the Psycho showerbath sequence, down to specific shots and camera angles open the way for some overt sadistic voyeurism."

TV Guide awarded the film 1 out of a possible 5 stars, calling the film "So ludicrous it's quite funny."
Jeremy Biltz from DVD Talk gave the film a positive review, writing, "Death Ship isn't a perfect film, but it is an enjoyable one, especially for fans of the somewhat lower tier horror efforts of the late seventies and early eighties."

References

External links
 
 
 

1980 films
1980 horror films
British supernatural horror films
Canadian supernatural horror films
Embassy Pictures films
English-language Canadian films
Films about survivors of seafaring accidents or incidents
Films directed by Alvin Rakoff
Films set on ships
Films shot in Alabama
American ghost films
Films about Nazis
Seafaring films
1980s supernatural horror films
Films shot in Quebec
Canadian ghost films
British ghost films
1980s American films
1980s Canadian films
1980s British films